Solomon Louis Drake (October 23, 1930 – August 18, 2021) was an American professional baseball outfielder who played in Major League Baseball (MLB) with the Chicago Cubs, Los Angeles Dodgers, and Philadelphia Phillies during the 1956 and 1959 baseball seasons, totaling 141 games played. Drake and his brother, Sammy, were the first African-American siblings to play in the big leagues.

Early life and career

Born in Little Rock, Arkansas, he graduated from Dunbar High School. Later that year, Drake began his baseball career when he joined the Elmwood Giants of the Mandak League as a 17-year-old outfielder; he returned for two more seasons, in Manitoba. A .300 hitter with Elmwood in 1950, Drake was signed before the 1951 season by the Chicago Cubs, as an amateur free agent. He spent that year with the Class C Topeka Owls, a minor league Cubs affiliate.

The Korean War interrupted his career for two years with Drake spending 1951 through 1953, in the U.S. Army. Following his military service, he completed his Bachelor of Arts degree in psychology and physical education, at Philander Smith College, and returned to minor league baseball in time for the 1954 season, with the Class A Des Moines Bruins.

Major league career
In April 1956, at the age of 25, Drake made his major league debut, with the Cubs. That same year, he also played with the Portland Beavers, Montreal Royals, and the Triple-A (AAA) St. Paul Saints. During the off-season, Drake played winter league in Cuba, from 1957–1959. He was named the 1957 Caribbean Series MVP, after leading Cuba's Tigres de Marianao to the championship. In 1958, Drake led the International League in several offensive categories, earning him a return to the National League (NL), playing with both the Los Angeles Dodgers and Philadelphia Phillies, in 1959. He announced his retirement from professional baseball, following the 1961 season.

Drake's younger brother, Sammy Drake, was also a professional player, who spent two MLB seasons with the Cubs and New York Mets. The National Baseball Hall of Fame and Museum states that the Drake brothers, Solly and Sammy, were the first African-American siblings to play in the majors in the 20th century.

Death
Drake died on August 18, 2021. He was 90 years old.

References

External links

1930 births
2021 deaths
African-American baseball players
Baseball players from Arkansas
Buffalo Bisons (minor league) players
Chicago Cubs players
Des Moines Bruins players
Los Angeles Angels (minor league) players
Los Angeles Dodgers players
Major League Baseball outfielders
Montreal Royals players
Philadelphia Phillies players
Philander Smith Panthers baseball players
Portland Beavers players
Portsmouth-Norfolk Tides players
St. Paul Saints (AA) players
Sportspeople from Little Rock, Arkansas
Topeka Owls players
Elmwood Giants players
American expatriate baseball players in Canada
Baptists from Arkansas
African-American Baptist ministers
20th-century African-American sportspeople
21st-century African-American people